The South Coast 23 is an American trailerable sailboat that was designed by Carl Alberg as a daysailer and cruiser and first built in 1965.

Production
The design was built by South Coast Seacraft in the United States, starting in 1965. A total of 250 were completed, but it is now out of production.

While many boats were delivered complete and ready-to-sail, South Coast Seacraft also supplied some boats as kits for amateur completion.

The South Coast 23 design was developed into the Kittiwake 23 in 1966 by the Kenner Boat Company, by taking one extra hull and using it to built a new mold, slightly lengthening it and changing the cabin top shape. Kenner was the contractor to South Coast that built the early South Coast 23 hulls and the Kittiwake 23 was developed when South Coast moved hull production away from Kenner.

Design
The South Coast 23 is a recreational keelboat, built predominantly of fiberglass, with wooden trim. It has a masthead sloop rig; a spooned, raked stem; a raised counter, angled transom with a lazarette; a keel-mounted rudder controlled by a tiller and a fixed long keel. It displaces  and carries  of ballast.

The boat is normally fitted with a small  well-mounted outboard motor for docking and maneuvering.

The design was available as a two-berth daysailer/overnighter model with a shorter cabin or as a four-berth cruiser. The latter model has sleeping accommodation for four people, with a double "V"-berth in the bow cabin and two straight settee berths in the main cabin. The galley is located on both sides just aft of the bow cabin. The galley is equipped with a sink and an icebox. The head is located in the bow cabin, under the "V"-berth.

Operational history
The boat is supported by an active class club that organizes racing events, the South Coast Seacraft Owners' Association.

In a 2010 review Steve Henkel, who completed and sailed a kit South Coast 23 with his wife, wrote, "best features: Carl Alberg did a good job designing a graceful-looking hull with springy sheer and relatively low freeboard. A cockpit-mounted outboard motor well and a lazarette to store the motor when not in use were also good ideas. A 6 hp outboard with a high-thrust prop is all the power she needed, even in heavy air. Worst features: The boat's biggest fault is probably the shallow (2' 10") draft, which isn't quite enough to make the boat as close winded as she otherwise could be. We like to claim that's why we never won a race with her."

See also
List of sailing boat types

Related development
Kittiwake 23

References

Keelboats
1960s sailboat type designs
Sailing yachts
Trailer sailers
Sailboat types built in the United States
Sailboat type designs by Carl Alberg
Sailboat types built by South Coast Seacraft